{{DISPLAYTITLE:Sigma1 Gruis}}

Sigma1 Gruis, a Latinization of σ1 Gruis, is a star in the constellation Grus. It is a dim, white-hued star near the lower limit for visibility to the naked eye with an apparent visual magnitude of 6.26. This object is located  distant from the Sun based on parallax. The radial velocity of this star is poorly constrained, but it appears to be drifting further away at the rate of +7 km/s.

This is an A-type main-sequence star with a stellar classification of A2 Vn; a star that is currently fusing its core hydrogen. It has a relatively high rate of spin as indicated by the 'n' suffix, showing a projected rotational velocity of 163 km/s. This object is 194 million years old with double the mass and radius of the Sun. The star is radiating 12 times the luminosity of the Sun from its photosphere at an effective temperature of 9,230 K. It is a source of X-ray emission, which may indicate it has an unseen stellar companion.

References

A-type main-sequence stars
Grus (constellation)
Gruis, Sigma1
214085
111594
8600
Durchmusterung objects